La Oroya District is one of ten districts of the Yauli Province in Peru. It is a region that is rich in zinc, lead and copper.

Geography 
Other mountains are listed below:

See also 
 Iskuqucha

References

Banco de Información Distrital. Retrieved April 11, 2008